Jennings-Marvin House is a historic home located at Dryden in Tompkins County, New York. It was built in 1897 and is a 2-story, three-bay, frame Queen Anne–style structure with Colonial Revival and Shingle style detailing.  The most notable feature is the -story octagonal tower with its wooden shingle sheathing and oval windows.

It was listed on the National Register of Historic Places in 1984.

References

Houses on the National Register of Historic Places in New York (state)
Queen Anne architecture in New York (state)
Colonial Revival architecture in New York (state)
Houses completed in 1897
Houses in Tompkins County, New York
National Register of Historic Places in Tompkins County, New York